The 2024 United States presidential election in Oregon is scheduled to take place on Tuesday, November 5, 2024, as part of the 2024 United States elections in which all 50 states plus the District of Columbia will participate. Oregon voters will choose electors to represent them in the Electoral College via a popular vote. The state of Oregon has eight electoral votes in the Electoral College, following reapportionment due to the 2020 United States census in which the state gained a seat.

Incumbent Democratic president Joe Biden has stated that he intends to run for reelection to a second term.

General election

Polling
Joe Biden vs. Donald Trump

See also 
 United States presidential elections in Oregon
 2024 United States presidential election
 2024 Democratic Party presidential primaries
 2024 Republican Party presidential primaries
 2024 United States elections

Notes

References 

Oregon
2024
Presidential